The Liaison Squadron of 3rd Aviation Corps (Serbo-Croatian: Eskadrila za vezu 3. vazduhoplovnog korpusa / Ескадрила за везу 3. ваздухопловног корпуса) was an aviation squadron of the Yugoslav Air Force formed in 1950 at Bornogaj airfield.

The squadron was part of 3rd Aviation Corps. It was equipped with various aircraft. The squadron was disbanded after 1956, estimated 1959.

Equipment
Polikarpov Po-2 
Yakovlev UT-2
AS.10 Oxford MkI & II
de Havilland DH 104 Dove IIB
Supermarine Spitfire MkVC

References

Yugoslav Air Force squadrons
Military units and formations established in 1949